Lucilinburhuc may refer to:

 Lucilinburhuc, one of the ancient names of Luxembourg.
 Lucilinburhuc, official name of star HD 45350, in the Auriga constellation.